Berkeley is a given name. Notable people with the name include:

 Berkeley Bell (1907–1967), American male tennis player
 Berkeley Breathed (born 1957), American cartoonist
 Berkeley L. Bunker (1906–1999), United States Senator and Representative from the state of Nevada
 Berkeley Cole (1913–1996), Anglican priest and author
 Berkeley Dallard (1889–1983), New Zealand accountant, senior public servant and prison administrator
 Berkeley Gaskin (1908–1979), West Indian cricketer
 Berkeley Guise (1775–1834), British landowner and Whig Member of Parliament
 Berkeley Lent (1921–2007), American politician and jurist in the state of Oregon
 Berkeley Levett (1863–1941), Major in the Scots Guards and later a Gentleman Usher for the Royal family
 Berkeley Deane Wise (1855–1909), Irish civil engineer

See also
Berkeley (surname)
Berkeley (disambiguation)